Leader is a 2010 Indian Telugu-language political drama film written and directed by Sekhar Kammula, and produced by AVM Productions. It stars debutant Rana Daggubati alongside Richa Gangopadhyay, Priya Anand, Suhasini Maniratnam, Suman, Subbaraju, Tanikella Bharani and Harsha Vardhan. The plot follows Arjun Prasad (Daggubati) who becomes the chief minister of Andhra Pradesh succeeding his deceased father and his struggle to fight the corruption plaguing the political system.

The film features music by Mickey J. Meyer with cinematography by Vijay C. Kumar and editing by Marthand K. Venkatesh. It was released on 19 February 2010. Leader is listed among the "25 Greatest Telugu Films Of The Decade" by Film Companion.

Plot
Sanjeevayya, the Chief Minister of Andhra Pradesh is dead. His last wish is that his son Arjun Prasad should succeed him as the next Chief Minister. However, Arjun's cousin Dhanunjay has aims to become the Chief Minister instead. Arjun is approached by Ali who has given 10 crores to Sanjeevayya to resolve a land dispute in Ali's favour. Arjun finds about his father's corruption, and his mother Rajeswari Devi validates it while sharing Sanjeevayya's desire for a casteless and corruption-less government. Arjun's uncle (Sanjeevayya's elder brother) Mahadevayya, whom he refers to as Peddaina, tolerates corruption as long as it helps his family stay in power. Arjun decides to fulfill his father's dream and enrolls Ali to quietly win the support of his party's MLAs and news reporter Ratna Prabha joins them. Arjun bribes his way to win support from MLAs and ministers and is elected Chief Minister by them. An angry Dhanunjay attempts to assassinate Arjun and is asked to resign from his ministerial post.

Arjun encounters resistance from his own party in his drive to eliminate corruption and plots to win the support of Alliance Party leader Munnuswami's daughter Archana by making her fall for him. His attempts to woo her are successful and he saves his government while Archana's parts away from him upon realizing that she has been used as a ploy. As a condition for Munnuswami's support, he lets an MLA's son go scot-free, even though the son was accused of raping and murdering of a young tribal girl. His mother Rajeswari Devi rebukes Arjun's move and warns the step as compromises that lead to corruption. That same night, she dies. Arjun resolves to go ahead with his corruption elimination drive and resigns the same evening while creating sensation in the media for exposing corruption.

Arjun wins the ensuing election after leaving his uncle's party and establishing a new party. His effort wins back Archana's support.

Cast

 Rana Daggubati as Arjun Prasad, a man who becomes the Chief Minister succeeding his deceased father
 Richa Gangopadhyay as Archana Prasad, a TV channel reporter
 Priya Anand as Ratna Prabha, a news reporter whom Arjun sends to help him win the support of his party's MLAs
 Suhasini Maniratnam as Rajeswari Devi, Arjun's mother
 Suman as CM Sanjeevayya, Arjun's father who gets assassinated
 Subbaraju as Dhanunjay, Arjun's cousin who attempts to assassinate him
 Kota Srinivasa Rao as Mahadevayya (Peddayana), Arjun's uncle and Sanjeevayya's elder brother
 Tanikella Bharani as Chief Secretary Sharma
 Harsha Vardhan as Ali, Arjun's personal secretary
 Rao Ramesh as Mavayya, Arjun's uncle
 Ahuti Prasad as Munnuswami, Archana's father and the Alliance Party leader
 Gollapudi Maruti Rao
 Narsing Yadav
 Rani Rudrama
 Shatru
 Vai Sista in a cameo role
 Udaya Bhanu as item number "Rajashekara"

Critical reception
Leader opened to rave reviews from critics. A The Times of India critic gave three stars of five, noting "Another lineage star Rana Daggubati takes his first bow at the Box Office with an inspiring political saga, he puts in a surprisingly mature performance (for a debutant) and shines in his role of a savvy young CEO of a US-based company who turns a conniving politician with effortless ease."

Radhika Rajamani from Rediff.com also gave a three star rating and said "The film is a relevant take on contemporary politics in the state of Andhra Pradesh. Performance-wise, Sekhar scores. His choice Suhasini as Arjun's mother is good. She brings grace and dignity to her role. An impressive debut, indeed. Richa Gangopadhyay looks pretty and charming. Harshavardhan (who plays Ali) and Priya Anand (Ratna Prabha) are competent in their roles. Mickey J Meyer's music is good too."

A reviewer from Sify explains "The technical aspects of the film are highly impressive with superb cinematography, excellent music and terrific background score. The first half is gripping, giving some promising moments to the audience. But, the second half slips into monotony thanks to the slipshod treatment to the political subject." However it praised the lead performances, saying "Rana has certainly lived up to the expectations of the audiences with his looks and thoroughly trained histrionics."

Soundtrack
The soundtrack has music composed by Mickey J. Meyer. The music was released on 22 November 2009.

References

External links
 
 Leader Telugu full movie in ZEE5 . https://www.zee5.com/movies/details/leader/0-0-234177

2010 films
Telugu films remade in other languages
2010s political drama films
Films about politicians
Films set in Hyderabad, India
Films shot in Hyderabad, India
Films scored by Mickey J Meyer
AVM Productions films
Indian political thriller films
Indian political drama films
Films directed by Sekhar Kammula
2010s Telugu-language films